Cynoglossus cynoglossus, commonly known as the Bengal tonguesole, sometimes called the Gangetic tongue sole, is a species of tonguefish. It is commonly found in the Indian Ocean, particularly in brackish water and muddy or sandy bottoms off the coast of India, Bangladesh and Burma east to the Philippines.

It reaches a length between 12.5 cm and 20 cm. The dorsal soft rays number between 95 and 102, and the anal soft rays between 72 and 78.
It feeds on benthic invertebrates.

References
Fishbase

Cynoglossidae
Fish described in 1822